Thomas Fletcher Neelands (March 8, 1862, Carleton, Ontario – December 2, 1944) was the ninth Mayor of Vancouver, British Columbia, serving from 1902 to 1903.

1862 births
1944 deaths
Mayors of Vancouver
20th-century Canadian politicians